Bucket o' Grease is an album by pianist Les McCann's group Les McCann Ltd., recorded in late 1966 and released on the Limelight label.

Reception

Allmusic gives the album 3 stars.

Track listing 
All compositions by Jerry Ross and Les McCann except as indicated
 "Hey Leroy, Your Mama's Callin' You" (Jimmy Castor) - 1:48
 "Bang! Bang!" (Joe Cuba, Jimmy Sabater) - 2:19
 "Music to Watch Girls By" (Sid Ramin) - 3:07
 "Watermelon Man" (Herbie Hancock) - 3:41
 "La Brea" - 3:53 	
 "All" (Marian Grudeff, Nino Oliviero, Raymond Jessel) - 2:43
 "Red Top" (Gene Ammons, Ben Kynard, Lionel Hampton) - 3:01
 "Yesterday" (John Lennon, Paul McCartney) - 3:09
 "Boo-Go-Loo" (Jerry Murray) - 2:51 	
 "Bucket O' Grease" - 2:45
 "Fake Out" - 2:33

Personnel 
Les McCann - piano, electric piano
Lee Katzman - trumpet, flugelhorn
Plas Johnson - tenor saxophone, flute 
Lynn Blessing - vibraphone 
Jimmy Georgantones - guitar
Leroy Vinnegar - bass
Booker T. Robinson - drums
Ron Rich, Ric Desilva, Aki Aleong, Joseph Torres - percussion

References 

Les McCann albums
1967 albums
Limelight Records albums